The 19th annual Berlin International Film Festival was held from 25 June – 6 July 1969. The Golden Bear was awarded to the Yugoslav film Rani radovi directed by Želimir Žilnik.

Jury
The following jury members were announced for the festival:
 Johannes Schaaf, actor, director and screenwriter (West Germany) - Jury President
 Agnesa Kalinova, journalist and film critic (Czechoslovakia) 
 José P. Dominiani, screenwriter and film critic (Argentina)
 François Chalais, journalist and film historian (Belgium)
 John Russell Taylor, writer and film critic (United Kingdom)
 Giovanni Grazzini, film critic (Italy)
 Masaki Kobayashi, director and screenwriter (Japan)
 Archer Winsten, film critic (United States)
 Ulrich Gregor, film historian (West Germany)

Films in competition
The following films were in competition for the Golden Bear award:

Key
{| class="wikitable" width="550" colspan="1"
| style="background:#FFDEAD;" align="center"| †
|Winner of the main award for best film in its section
|}

Awards

The following prizes were awarded by the Jury:
 Golden Bear: Rani radovi by Želimir Žilnik
 Silver Bear: 
 Un tranquillo posto di campagna by Elio Petri
 Greetings by Brian De Palma
 Ich bin ein Elefant, Madame by Peter Zadek
 Made in Sweden by Johan Bergenstråhle
 Brasil Ano 2000 by Walter Lima, Jr.
Youth Film Award
Best Feature Film Suitable for Young People: Rani radovi by Želimir Žilnik
OCIC Award
Midnight Cowboy by John Schlesinger
C.I.D.A.L.C. Gandhi Award
The Bed Sitting Room by Richard Lester
UNICRIT Award
Erotissimo by Gérard Pirès

References

External links
19th Berlin International Film Festival 1969
1969 Berlin International Film Festival
Berlin International Film Festival:1969  at Internet Movie Database

19
1969 film festivals
1969 in West Germany
1960s in West Berlin